The Lhagba Pool was a high altitude lake considered to exist, but an examination of evidence, including satellite photos leads to a conclusion that it has dried out. It was considered the highest lake in Tibet and the second highest lake in the world, behind Ojos del Salado's crater lake. It was not a major attraction, but was said to be a surprisingly wide (50m) and long (180m) lake.

References

Lakes of Tibet